Bordeaux is a suburb of Johannesburg, South Africa. Found north of the Johannesburg CBD, it is next to the suburbs of Ferndale, Blairgowrie and Hurlingham. It is located in Region B of the City of Johannesburg Metropolitan Municipality.

History
The suburb is situated on part of an old Witwatersrand farm called Klipfontein 479. It was established in April 1940 and named after the French city of Bordeaux.

Schools
The suburb currently has only one school, Bordeaux Primary. The other, Greenhills Primary School, was closed down (year TBC) owing to dwindling young population in the area.

References

Johannesburg Region B